National Barn Dance, broadcast by WLS-AM in Chicago, Illinois starting in 1924, was one of the first American country music radio programs and a direct precursor of the Grand Ole Opry.

National Barn Dance also set the stage for other similar programs, in part because the clear-channel signal of WLS could be received throughout most of the Midwest and even beyond in the late evening and nighttime hours, making much of the United States (and Canada) a potential audience. The program was well received and thus widely imitated. National Barn Dance ended its broadcast in 1968.

History

National Barn Dance was founded by Edgar L. Bill. To him goes the credit for arranging to have a program of "down-home" tunes broadcast from radio station WLS, of which Bill was then director. Having lived on a farm, he knew how people loved the familiar sound and informal spirit of old-fashioned barn dance music. The first broadcast was an impromptu sustaining program. An avalanche of telephone calls and letters indicated a definite demand from the public for this type of broadcast, and National Barn Dance was born.  It first aired on WLS on April 19, 1924, and originated from the Eighth Street Theater starting in 1931.  The show was picked up by NBC Radio in 1933. NBC expanded the program's coverage in 1942, adding it to the schedules of international shortwave stations. In 1946 it switched to the ABC Radio Network and aired until 1952 on Saturday nights from 6:30 p.m. to midnight.

George D. Hay (a.k.a. The Solemn Ole Judge) has always claimed that he started the WLS Barn Dance when he worked for them as an announcer, but research is showing that this was a falsehood of documented history and that his claim was to help him get a job as the first director of WSM Radio c. 1925 Nashville, Tennessee.

The show regularly featured Gene Autry, Red Foley, The Three Little Maids, Jenny Lou Carson, Eddie Dean, Lulu Belle and Scotty, Pat Buttram, George Gobel, The Williams Brothers (featuring future crooner Andy Williams), Arkansas Woodchopper, The DeZurik Sisters and the Hoosier Hot Shots. Other guests included Smiley Burnette, Eddie Peabody and Joe Kelly, best remembered today as the host and moderator of NBC's Quiz Kids. The announcer was Jack Holden and it was once sponsored by Alka-Seltzer. The program aired from The Center Theater in Chicago, and people used to stand outside in the snow and cold waiting to get in. The National Barn Dance was the only known radio program to charge an admission fee.

ABC made two moves that ultimately led to National Barn Dances slow demise. The first was the cancellation of the network broadcast in 1952. After a few years, audiences finally began to wane, and the program ceased live performances after 1957. The show continued to air on WLS until 1959 when ABC bought the station and changed the format to Top 40 rock and roll, canceling National Barn Dance outright. The show moved to Chicago's WGN-AM, with Orion Samuelson as the show's host, until it finally left the air in 1968.

Chronology
1924–33: WLS (AM)
1925–28: Two separate versions, WLS-AM (National Barn Dance) and WSM-AM (WSM Barn Dance); the latter became the Grand Ole Opry in 1928
1933–46: WLS (AM), carried by NBC Radio
1946–52: WLS (AM), carried by ABC Radio
1952–60: WLS (AM)
1960–68: WGN-AM

 Performers 
Charles M. Bardy
William Bardy
Byron Bouchard

Film and TV
A fictionalized account of the show's origins, The National Barn Dance (1944), was filmed by director Hugh Bennett from a screenplay by Hal Fimberg and Lee Loeb. The film starred Jean Heather, Charles Quigley, Robert Benchley, Mabel Paige and Charles Dingle, while Pat Buttram and Joe Kelly appeared as themselves.  Two acts who were radio show regulars, The Hoosier Hotshots and The Dinning Sisters, also had featured musical spots in the film.  Paramount Pictures reportedly paid WLS $75,000 for the rights in 1943.ABC Barn Dance, a filmed TV series featuring some of the radio performers, was telecast on ABC from February 21–November 14, 1949. Hosted by Jack Stillwell and Hal O'Halloran, the 30-minute musical variety format presented a mix of folk music with country and Western tunes.

In 1964, it became a nationally syndicated program through Mid-America Video Tape Productions, then a subsidiary of television station WGN-TV in Chicago (the predecessor of Tribune Entertainment).

Offshoots
In 1925, prior to network radio or syndication, Hay brought his Barn Dance concept to Nashville, Tennessee. The result was a show called the WSM Barn Dance. It became so popular that on December 10, 1927, Hay renamed it the Grand Ole Opry. WSM became one of the first NBC affiliates in 1927, and the Opry is still on the air today.

A second program was launched in the 1930s by National Barn Dances then-president John Lair in Renfro Valley, Kentucky; the Renfro Valley Barn Dance still takes place weekly but is no longer aired on radio (although a sister program, the Renfro Valley Gatherin', does still air weekly on Sunday mornings).

References

Prairie Farmer WLS National Barn Dance Crew photograph dated June 16, 1934 in "WLS Family Album 1935." Chicago: The Prairie Farmer Publishing Company, 1934, p. 30.

Listen to
National Barn Dance (October 2, 1943)

External links

WLS National Barn Dance

PBS: The Hayloft Gang: The Story of the National Barn Dance

1924 radio programme debuts
1968 radio programme endings
1920s American radio programs
1930s American radio programs
1940s American radio programs
1950s American radio programs
American country music radio programs
Chicago radio shows
NBC Blue Network radio programs
NBC radio programs
ABC radio programs